Deeper Smart Sonar is a wireless, castable echo-sounder compatible with iOS and Android smartphones and tablets. Wi-Fi connection enabled to maximize both the distance between the sounder and the device holder up to 330 ft / 100 m and the depth range up to 260 ft / 80 m. The scanning frequency allows the device to capture fast-moving objects and the scanning resolution measures small objects.

Usage 
Deeper sonar can be cast to any spot in the water. While floating on the water surface it connects to a smart device and transmits information which is used for finding fish, getting depth information, exploring bottom contour and vegetation, and temperature.

Operation 
Operation of Deeper is based on echolocation and wi-fi technologies. Echolocation is a method for detecting and locating objects submerged in water. When a sound signal is produced, the time it takes for the signal to reach an object and for its echo to return is issued to calculate the distance between the sonar and the object. Wi-Fi allows transference of the sonar readings to a smartphone or tablet from up to 330 ft / 100 meters.

Technical specifications 
Deeper sonar can be cast from varying heights and positions.

App 
Deeper app is compatible with iOS 8.0 and Android 4.0 to the latest iOS and Android devices .
Features:

 Real-time mapping & offline maps
 Unlimited data history
 Ice fishing mode
 Solunar calendar, notes, camera, social media sharing
 Sleep feature to pause battery use when in water (low power-consumption mode)

See also
 Fishfinder

References

External links
 

Sonar
Fishing equipment
Wireless
Lithuanian brands